Jovan Radivojević (Serbian Cyrillic: Јован Радивојевић; born 29 October 1982) is a Serbian footballer who plays for Proleter Novi Sad in the Serbian First League.

Career statistics

External links
 Official website
 Utakmica profile

1982 births
Living people
Footballers from Novi Sad
Serbian footballers
Association football midfielders
RFK Novi Sad 1921 players
FK Hajduk Kula players
FK Rad players
OFK Beograd players
FK Borac Čačak players
FK Banat Zrenjanin players
FK Leotar players
NK Zvijezda Gradačac players
FK Proleter Novi Sad players
Serbian SuperLiga players
Serbian expatriate footballers
Expatriate footballers in Bosnia and Herzegovina